Troy Township is one of eleven townships in Fountain County, Indiana. As of the 2010 census, its population was 3,711 and it contained 1,657 housing units.

Geography
Troy Township lies along the western side of Fountain County; the Wabash River defines the western borders of both.

Troy Township contains the Fountain County seat of Covington, in the western part of the county near the river.  At one time, the unincorporated community of Layton existed in the southeast part of the township along the present route of U.S. Route 136.

Interstate 74 passes through the southern part of the township.  U.S. Route 136 lies to the north of I-74 for most of its route; it passes through Covington, but east of Layton, I-74 crosses to its north side.

Cemeteries
The township contains the four cemeteries of Bend, Mount Hope, Prescott Grove and Sand Hill.

References
 United States Census Bureau cartographic boundary files
 U.S. Board on Geographic Names

Bibliography

External links
 Indiana Township Association
 United Township Association of Indiana

Townships in Fountain County, Indiana
Townships in Indiana